The Ambassador Extraordinary and Plenipotentiary of the Russian Federation to the Republic of Malta is the official representative of the President and the Government of the Russian Federation to the President and the Government of Malta.

The ambassador and his staff work at large in the Embassy of Russia in the town of San Ġwann, close to the capital of Valletta.

History of diplomatic relations

Diplomatic relations between the Soviet Union and Malta were established on 19 July 1967. Diplomatic relations were initially handled by the Soviet ambassador to the United Kingdom, who held concurrent accreditation as the ambassador to Malta. The first such ambassador was Mikhail Smirnovsky, who was appointed ambassador to Malta on 30 October 1967, and who presented his letter of credence on 10 November 1967. The State of Malta had declared independence in 1964, though it continued to be a Commonwealth realm until 1974, when it became an independent republic, while remaining within the Commonwealth. Relations continued to be through the Soviet embassy in London until the opening of an embassy in Malta on 1 July 1981. With the dissolution of the Soviet Union in 1991, the government of Malta recognized the Russian Federation in December 1991. The Soviet ambassador,  was replaced by Valentina Matviyenko as ambassador for Russia, and continued as representative of the Russian Federation until 1994.

List of representatives (1967 – present)

Representatives of the Soviet Union to the State of Malta (1967 – 1974)

Representatives of the Soviet Union to the Republic of Malta (1974 – 1991)

Representatives of the Russian Federation to Malta (1991 – present)

References 

 
Malta
Russia